The Rotowhenua River is a river of the Northland Region of New Zealand's North Island. A short, broad river, it flows into the Awaroa River to form a northern arm of the Whangape Harbour.

References

See also
List of rivers of New Zealand

Rivers of the Northland Region
Rivers of New Zealand